Stay Tuned is a 1992 American fantasy comedy film directed by Peter Hyams and written by Jim Jennewein and Tom S. Parker. The film stars John Ritter, Pam Dawber, Jeffrey Jones, and Eugene Levy. Its plot follows a suburban couple who are sucked into a television world by an emissary of hell, and must survive for 24 hours in order to be released from it.

Stay Tuned was released in the United States on August 14, 1992, by Warner Bros. Pictures. The film received mixed reviews from critics and grossed $12 million.

Plot
Struggling Seattle plumbing salesman, former fencing athlete, and couch potato Roy Knable lives with his neglected wife Helen, a vitamin product senior manager who attempts to divorce him. After a fight (which involved Helen smashing the family television screen with one of Roy's fencing trophies as a wake-up call to reality), Mr. Spike, a mysterious salesman, appears at the couples' door, offering them a new high-tech satellite dish system filled with 666 channels of programs one cannot view on regular television. Unbeknownst to Roy, Spike is an emissary from hell who wants to boost the influx of souls by arranging for TV junkies to be killed in the most gruesome and ironic situations imaginable. The 'candidates' are sucked into a hellish television world, called Hellevision, and put through a gauntlet where they must survive a number of demonic satirical versions of sitcoms and movies. If they can survive for 24 hours, they are free to go, but if they get killed, then their souls will become the property of Satan.

The dish eventually sucks Roy and Helen into this warped world. Spike pursues them, entering some shows along with the Knables to halt their advance. Through tenacity, improvisation, and sheer luck, the Knables stay alive, and their young son Darryl recognizes his parents fighting for their lives on the TV set. He and his older sister Diane are able to provide assistance from the real world. This infuriates Spike to the point that he makes good on Roy's contract, releasing him, but not Helen, as she was not in the system under contract.

Having no choice, Roy re-enters the system to save Helen while bringing his own remote control with him, allowing them to control their journey. After being pursued by Spike through several more channels, Roy finally confronts his enemy in a Salt-N-Pepa music video, gets hold of Spike's remote, and uses it to save Helen from being run over by a train in a Western movie. By pressing the "off" button on the remote, they are evicted from the dish moments before it sucks their neighbor's abusive Rottweiler into the TV and destroys itself. In the end, Spike gets eliminated by the Rottweiler on the command of Crowley, a vengeful employee he banished to the system earlier, and is then succeeded in his executive position by Pierce, a younger upstart employee. Having learned a valuable lesson after his adventure, Roy dramatically cuts back on his TV viewing, quits his job as a plumbing salesman, and opens his own fencing school, in which he advises one of his students that watching too much TV can get you into trouble.

Cast

The group's manager and primary producer Hurby "Luv Bug" Azor (credited under his birth name "Herby Azor") and his brother Steve Azor appear as dancers during the "Start Me Up" segment.

Production
In 1990, Jim Jennewein and Tom S. Parker wrote the entire story for the film, under working title Terrorvision (not to be confused with TerrorVision), inspired by the idea was "The Evil Dead meets Monty Python".

Tim Burton was originally chosen to be the director on account of his art and style, but left to direct Batman Returns.

The script was purchased by Warner Bros. for $750,000.

Reception
The film was not screened for film critics. The film holds a 47% approval rating on Rotten Tomatoes from 17 reviews, with an average score of 4.6/10. On Metacritic, the film has a score of 41 out of 100, based on 16 critics, indicating "mixed or average reviews".

Stephen Holden of The New York Times called the film a "cleverly plotted movie" based on a "nifty satiric concept" but said that "most of its takeoffs ... show no feel for genre and no genuine wit." Rita Kempley of The Washington Post called the film "wonderfully silly" and a "zippy action spoof." Variety reported the film was "not diabolical enough for true black comedy, too scary and violent for kids lured by its PG rating and witless in its sendup of obsessive TV viewing...a picture with nothing for everybody"; it noted that the "six-minute cartoon interlude by the masterful Chuck Jones, with Ritter and Dawber portrayed as mice menaced by a robot cat...has a grace and depth sorely lacking in the rest of the movie." Time Out called it "pointless 'satire'" with the "emotional depth of a 30-second soap commercial."

Box office
Stay Tuned opened at #6 in the US, which the Los Angeles Times called a "fuzzy reception".  The film grossed $10.7 million in the US and Canada and grossed only $1 million internationally for a worldwide total of $12 million.

Television adaptation
In August 2020, it was reported that AMC Studios was developing a television series adaptation of the film with Ian B. Goldberg and Richard Naing as writers, a part of Goldberg's overall deal at AMC Studios.

Soundtrack

The soundtrack to the film is made up entirely of hip hop songs with the exception of the last two tracks, which were themes composed by Bruce Broughton. Tracks in bold are used in the movie.

Track listing

Score album
Broughton's score was released in 2011 by Intrada Records.

References

External links

 
 
 
 'Stay Tuned' on a Spoofy Wavelength from Los Angeles Times

1992 films
1992 comedy films
1990s adventure films
1990s American films
1990s English-language films
1990s fantasy comedy films
American adventure comedy films
American black comedy films
American dark fantasy films
American fantasy comedy films
American films about revenge
American films with live action and animation
American parody films
Films about divorce
Films about death
Films about television
Films directed by Peter Hyams
Films scored by Bruce Broughton
Films set in Seattle
Films with screenplays by Jim Jennewein
Morgan Creek Productions films
Warner Bros. films